Vícam  is a town in the Mexican state of Sonora located in the municipio of Guaymas. It is one of the main settlements of the Yaqui people. Historically the Yaqui also ranged through what is now the American Southwest, and there is a federally recognized tribe in the United States state of Arizona.

History
Vícam is one of the eight mission villages in which the Yaqui were settled in the early seventeenth century by Spanish Jesuit missionaries, along with Pótam, Torim Bácum, Cócorit, Huiviris, Benem and Rahum.  Today it is the second largest settlement in the municipality of Guaymas, and one of the main Yaqui settlements. Vícam hosted the Meeting of the Indigenous Peoples of the Americas from October 11–14, 2007.

Hundreds of people, few wearing face masks or keeping a healthy distance, attended the “Gran Bailazo 2021” featuring Norteño and dancing in Vícam on January 16–17, 2021 during the COVID-19 pandemic in Mexico. No one was charged, and another event is planned for February 13. Sonora is on Orange Alert and Mexico is experiencing the fourth highest levels of COVID-19 infections in the world.

Description and demographics
Vícam is located at the south end of the municipio and at an altitude of 10 meters above sea level. Federal Highway 15 connects it to the north with Guaymas and Hermosillo, and to the south with Ciudad Obregón and Navojoa.

According to the Census of Population and Housing conducted in 2005 by the National Institute of Statistics and Geography, the total population of Vícam is 8,578, 4,207 of whom are men and 4,371 of whom are women.

References 

Populated places in Sonora